Lynch Hill Enterprise Academy (LHEA) is a secondary  school with academy status which opened in September 2014. The school is located in Slough, in the English county of Berkshire. The school is non-selective and has an intake of 180 students per year at key stages 3 and 4.

The curriculum and learning opportunities at LHEA allow students to combine academic and vocational learning in purpose-built facilities.

History
On 13 July 2012, Lynch Hill School Primary Academy bid to open a new enterprise academy free school, to extend their education provision into Key Stage 3 and 4. It was one of the 102 successful free school bids announced by the coalition Government. The new academy officially opened in September 2014, with the primary academy as a sponsor.

Both schools formed the basis of a multi-academy trust: The Learning Alliance Academy Trust. In 2019, the Learning Alliance Academy Trust became part of the Slough and East Berkshire Church of England Multi-Academy Trust (SEBMAT).

References

External links
Lynch Hill Enterprise Academy official website

Secondary schools in Slough
Free schools in England
2014 establishments in England
Educational institutions established in 2014